The 2020 New Zealand Sevens was the third tournament within the 2019–20 World Rugby Sevens Series and the twenty first edition of the New Zealand Sevens. This event was the first in the series to only have one team from each pool qualify to the cup knockout phase. Host team  won the tournament, defeating  by 21–5 in the final.

Format
The sixteen teams were drawn into four pools of four teams, with each team playing every other team in their pool once. The top team from each pool advanced to the semifinals to playoff for berths in the cup final and third place match.

The teams that finished second in their respective pool will play another team from another pool whom finished second, however, it will be ranked as the best second placed team v. the second best second placed team and vice versa. This is the first tournament of the 2019–20 season that the format was changed to a four team cup knockout phase. 

The pools and schedule were announced by World Rugby on 20 December 2019.

Pool stage
All times in NZL Standard Time (UTC+12:00)

Pool A

Pool B

Pool C

Pool D

Placement matches

Fifteenth place

Thirteenth place

Eleventh place

Ninth place

Seventh place

Fifth place

Cup

Tournament placings

See also
 2020 New Zealand Women's Sevens
 World Rugby Sevens Series
 2019–20 World Rugby Sevens Series

References

External links
 Tournament site
 World Rugby info

2020
2019–20 World Rugby Sevens Series
2020 in New Zealand rugby union
January 2020 sports events in New Zealand